Meyerhoff may refer to:

People
 Arthur Meyerhoff (1895–1986), advertising agency executive and entrepreneur
 Arthur A. Meyerhoff (1928–1994), American geologist 
 Harvey Meyerhoff (born 1927), American businessman
 Howard Meyerhoff (1899–1982), American geologist 
 Joseph Meyerhoff (1899–1985), Baltimore businessman and philanthropist
 Otto Fritz Meyerhof (1884–1951), German-born physician and biochemist

Other uses
 Joseph Meyerhoff Symphony Hall, or simply the Meyerhoff, a music venue in Baltimore , Maryland, U.S.

See also
 Meyerhoff Scholarship Program, a University of Maryland program
 Meyerhoff manifold, in hyperbolic geometry
 Meierhof

Jewish surnames
Yiddish-language surnames